is a 1989 role-playing video game for the Family Computer (Famicom/NES) published by Bandai. The game commemorates the 20th anniversary of Shueisha's manga anthology Weekly Shōnen Jump.

The game is set in a world that brings together many of the long-running titles, which include stories of the past and present at the time of their release, that had appeared in the magazine.  The game consists of a main character wandering and encountering the many Jump heroes as they try to save the world from an alliance of many of the most powerful and evil of the Jump villains.

The game sold 1.1 million cartridges for the Famicom in Japan. It was the first title in the Jump video game series. It had a sequel, Famicom Jump II: Saikyō no Shichinin. Due to it being based on a magazine specifically localized for the Japanese market, the game was never released outside Japan.

The 16 Heroes
One of the main objectives of the game is to recruit 16 notable Jump hero characters in order to use them to fight against the enemies in the game's overworld, which is divided into several different areas.  Aside from the player character, the Jump characters that can be collected are:
 Kenshiro (Fist of the North Star)
 Nukesaku Aida (Tsuide ni Tonchinkan)
 Son Goku (Dragon Ball)
 Ryo Saeba (City Hunter)
 Arale Norimaki (Dr. Slump)
 Pegasus Seiya (Saint Seiya)
 Momotaro Tsurugi (Sakigake!! Otokojuku)
 Mankichi Tokawa (Otoko Ippiki Gaki Daishō)
 Reiki Kikoku (Godsider)
 Joseph Joestar (JoJo's Bizarre Adventure)
 Jouji Kanno (Doberman Deka)
 Isamu (Kōya no Shōnen Isamu)
 Tsubasa Oozora (Captain Tsubasa)
 Tarou Yamashita (Kenritsu Umisora Kōkō Yakyūbuin Yamashita Tarō-kun)
 Kyūichi Uno (Astro Kyūdan)
 Kinnikuman (Kinnikuman)

Of particular note: Son Goku and Momotaro Tsurugi are the only characters who return in Famicom Jump II: Saikyō no Shichinin. Of the series with hero characters, JoJo's Bizarre Adventure also has a playable hero in the sequel, with Joseph succeeded by Jotaro Kujo. One NPC character in this game, Ryotsu Kankichi from Kochira Katsushika-ku Kameari Kōen-mae Hashutsujo, becomes playable as well in the sequel.

Represented series

 Astro Kyūdan
 Captain Tsubasa
 Cat's Eye
 Chichi no Tamashii
 Circuit no Ōkami
 City Hunter
 Doberman Deka
 Dr. Slump
 Dragon Ball
 Fist of the North Star
 Ginga: Nagareboshi Gin
 Godsider
 Harenchi Gakuen
 High School! Kimengumi
 Hōchōnin Ajihei
 JoJo's Bizarre Adventure
 Kenritsu Umisora Kōkō Yakyūbuin Yamashita Tarō-kun
 Kick Off
 Kimagure Orange Road
 Kinnikuman
 Kochira Katsushika-ku Kameari Kōen-mae Hashutsujo
 Kōya no Shōnen Isamu
 Moeru! Onīsan
 Otoko Ippiki Gaki Daishō
 Ring ni Kakero
 Saint Seiya
 Sakigake!! Otokojuku
 Shape Up Ran
 THE MOMOTAROH
 Toilet Hakase
 Tsuide ni Tonchinkan
 Wing-Man
 Yoroshiku Mechadoc

References

1989 video games
Action role-playing video games
Bandai Namco Entertainment franchises
Crossover role-playing video games
Dragon Ball games
Fist of the North Star video games
Japan-exclusive video games
JoJo's Bizarre Adventure games
Nintendo Entertainment System games
Nintendo Entertainment System-only games
Saint Seiya video games
Shueisha franchises
Tose (company) games
Video games based on anime and manga
Video games developed in Japan
Weekly Shōnen Jump (video game series)